The Westport Bank and Trust Company is a historic commercial building at 87 Post Road East in Westport, Connecticut.  It is a two-story Classical Revival brick building, designed by local architect Charles E. Cutler and built in 1924.  The bank was founded in 1852 by Horace Staples, a prominent local businessman, and was a longtime fixture in the local economy.  The building is notable for its architecture, and for a series of murals in its lobby, commissioned in the 1960s and executed by Robert L. Lambdin, an artist best known for his Depression-era work funded by the Works Progress Administration.

The building was listed on the National Register of Historic Places on November 6, 2006.

See also
National Register of Historic Places listings in Fairfield County, Connecticut

References

National Register of Historic Places in Fairfield County, Connecticut
Neoclassical architecture in Connecticut
Commercial buildings completed in 1924
Buildings and structures in Westport, Connecticut